The 2014 Junior World Weightlifting Championships were held in Sports Palace Kazan, Russia from 20 to 28 June 2014.

Medal summary

Men

Women

Medal table
Ranking by Big (Total result) medals

Ranking by all medals: Big (Total result) and Small (Snatch and Clean & Jerk)

References

External links
Start Book
Results Book

IWF Junior World Weightlifting Championships
World Junior Weightlifting Championships
World Junior Weightlifting Championships
June 2014 sports events in Russia
Weightlifting